Herman Joseph Martell (December 8, 1900 – October 27, 1957) was an American football player in the National Football League.

Biography
Martell was born on December 8, 1900, in Crystal Falls, Michigan. He died in Green Bay on October 27, 1957.

Career
Martell played with the Green Bay Packers from 1919 to 1921.

See also
List of Green Bay Packers players

References

1900 births
1957 deaths
Green Bay Packers players
People from Crystal Falls, Michigan
American football ends
Players of American football from Michigan